The 2023 Nicky Rackard Cup is the 19th staging of the Nicky Rackard Cup since its establishment by the Gaelic Athletic Association in 2005. The cup is scheduled to begin in April 2023 and scheduled to end in June 2023.

Tyrone, the defending champions, were promoted to the 2023 Christy Ring Cup.

Team changes

To Championship 
Relegated from the Christy Ring Cup

 Wicklow

Promoted from the Lory Meagher Cup

 Louth

From Championship 
Promoted to the Christy Ring Cup

 Tyrone

Relegated to the Lory Meagher Cup

 Warwickshire

Group stage

Knockout stage

Final

The winning team is scheduled for promotion to the 2024 Christy Ring Cup.

References

Nicky Rackard Cup
Nicky Rackard Cup
Nicky Rackard Cup